Gundeboina Rammurthy Yadav (26 October 1947 – 11 October 2019) was an Indian politician belonging to Telangana Rashtra Samithi. He was elected a member of Andhra Pradesh Legislative Assembly from Chalakurthi in 1994. He died on 11 October 2019.

References

2019 deaths
Telangana Rashtra Samithi politicians
Members of the Andhra Pradesh Legislative Assembly
1947 births